Labidochromis is a genus of cichlid fishes that are endemic to Lake Malawi in East Africa. The genus includes 18 formally described species, and several yet undescribed species. It includes a number of species commonly kept in cichlid aquariums such as L. caeruleus (electric yellow). The species in this genus can easily hybridize, so if kept in an aquarium it is recommended to only have one species from this genus.

Species
There are currently 18 recognized species in this genus:
 Labidochromis caeruleus  Fryer, 1956 (Blue streak hap)
 Labidochromis chisumulae D. S. C. Lewis, 1982
 Labidochromis flavigulis D. S. C. Lewis, 1982 (Chisumulu pearl)
 Labidochromis freibergi D. S. Johnson, 1974
 Labidochromis gigas D. S. C. Lewis, 1982
 Labidochromis heterodon D. S. C. Lewis, 1982
 Labidochromis ianthinus D. S. C. Lewis, 1982
 Labidochromis lividus D. S. C. Lewis, 1982
 Labidochromis maculicauda D. S. C. Lewis, 1982
 Labidochromis mathotho W. E. Burgess & H. R. Axelrod, 1976
 Labidochromis mbenjii D. S. C. Lewis, 1982
 Labidochromis mylodon D. S. C. Lewis, 1982
 Labidochromis pallidus D. S. C. Lewis, 1982
 Labidochromis perlmutt
 Labidochromis shiranus D. S. C. Lewis, 1982
 Labidochromis strigatus D. S. C. Lewis, 1982
 Labidochromis textilis M. K. Oliver, 1975
 Labidochromis vellicans Trewavas, 1935
 Labidochromis zebroides D. S. C. Lewis, 1982

There is also one potentially undescribed species:
 Labidochromis sp. Hongi

References 

 
Haplochromini
Cichlid genera

Taxa named by Ethelwynn Trewavas